The Elisha Taylor House is a historic private house located at 59 Alfred Street in Midtown Detroit, Michigan, within the Brush Park district. The house was designated a Michigan State Historic Site in 1973 and listed on the National Register of Historic Places in 1975. Since 1981, it has served as a center for art and architectural study, known as the Art House.

History

The Elisha Taylor House was built in 1871 for William H. Craig, a local lawyer, land speculator, and president of the Detroit Board of Trade. The architects were Koch & Hess of Milwaukee and Detroit. In 1875, Craig sold the house to attorney Elisha Taylor. Taylor was a Detroit attorney who held many offices during his career, including City Attorney, assistant Michigan Attorney General from 1837 to 1841, and Circuit Court Commissioner from 1846 to 1854.

Description
The Elisha Taylor House is two-and-a-half stories tall, made of red brick on a rough stone foundation. The structure is an eclectic mix of Gothic and Tudor Revival with elements of other styles, including Queen Anne and Italianate. The house has a high mansard roof with large protruding dormers and unusual vergeboarding at the peak. It is one of the best examples surviving in Detroit of post-Civil War residential design.

Current use
Since 1981, the structure has been used as a center for art and architectural study. The interior has been well preserved, boasting original fireplaces, mirrors, woodwork, decorative plaster, stenciling, Mintons floor tiles, parquet floors, and etched glass.

References

External links
Art House — Tours

Houses in Detroit
Houses completed in 1870
1870 establishments in Michigan
Historic district contributing properties in Michigan
Michigan State Historic Sites in Wayne County, Michigan
National Register of Historic Places in Wayne County, Michigan
Houses on the National Register of Historic Places in Michigan
Second Empire architecture in Michigan
Victorian architecture in Michigan